Savage X Fenty Show is an American television special about the annual fashion show for Rihanna's lingerie brand Savage X Fenty, also featuring music performances. The first, non-televised event took place in Brooklyn during New York Fashion Week. The first television special premiered on September 20, 2019, Vol. 2 premiered on October 2, 2020, Vol. 3 premiered on September 24, 2021, and Vol. 4 premiered on November 9, 2022, all on Amazon Prime Video. Rihanna is the executive producer and creative director of Savage X Fenty Show.

Throughout the years, the television special has won three Webby Awards, and received nominations from the Set Decorators Society of America Awards and the Art Directors Guild Awards. In 2022, it won the Primetime Emmy Award for Outstanding Choreography for Variety or Reality Programming for Parris Goebel's work on Vol. 3.

History
In 2018, Rihanna launched a new lingerie line called Savage X Fenty. On September 12, 2018, the first Savage X Fenty Show took place at New York Fashion Week. Models included Bella Hadid, Gigi Hadid, Indira Scott, and Slick Woods. Harper's Bazaar called it "a celebration of racial diversity and body inclusivity." Savage x Fenty is a company that celebrates all body shapes and encourages confidence through women and men lingerie.

On September 10, 2019, the first special was filmed at Barclays Center in Brooklyn for New York Fashion Week, with a group of dancers choreographed by Parris Goebel. It featured Rihanna, along with supermodels Gigi Hadid, Bella Hadid, Cara Delevingne, and Joan Smalls, appearances by 21 Savage, Normani, Christian Combs, and Paloma Elsesser, and performances by Halsey, Migos, Big Sean, DJ Khaled, Fat Joe, Fabolous, Tierra Whack, and A$AP Ferg.

Vol. 2 was filmed at the Los Angeles Convention Center and showcases Rihanna's Fall 2020 collection, and includes performances by Travis Scott, Miguel, Rosalía, Bad Bunny, Ella Mai, Mustard, and Roddy Ricch. Featured on the runway are Bella Hadid, Big Sean, Cara Delevingne, Christian Combs, Normani, Paloma Elsesser, Lizzo, Demi Moore, Gigi Goode, Irina Shayk, Laura Harrier, Paris Hilton, Rico Nasty, Ryan Garcia, Shea Couleé, Willow Smith, and Jaida Essence Hall, with dancers choreographed by Parris Goebel.

Vol. 3 was filmed at the Westin Bonaventure Hotel in Los Angeles and includes performances by Nas, Daddy Yankee, BIA, Jazmine Sullivan, Ricky Martin, Normani, and Jade Novah, and appearances from Adriana Lima, Alek Wek, Behati Prinsloo, Bella Poarch, Eartheater, Emily Ratajkowski, Erykah Badu, Gigi Hadid, Gottmik, Irina Shayk, Jeremy Pope, Joan Smalls, Jojo T. Gibbs, Leiomy, Lola Leon, Lucky Blue Smith, Mena Massoud, Nyjah Huston, Sabrina Carpenter, Soo Joo Park, Symone, Thuso Mbedu, Troye Sivan, Vanessa Hudgens, and Cindy Crawford.

For Vol. 4, Rihanna again serves as executive producer and creative director. It includes performances by Anitta, Burna Boy, Don Toliver, and Maxwell, and features Johnny Depp, Ángela Aguilar, Avani Gregg, Bella Poarch, Cara Delevingne, Damson Idris, Irina Shayk, Joan Smalls, Kornbread, Lara Stone, Lilly Singh, Marsai Martin, Precious Lee, Rickey Thompson, Sheryl Lee Ralph, Simu Liu, Taraji P. Henson, Taylour Paige, Winston Duke, and Zach Miko.

Release
Savage X Fenty Show was released on Amazon Prime Video on September 20, 2019. A teaser for Savage X Fenty Show Vol. 2 was released on September 25, 2020, and it premiered on Prime Video on October 2, 2020. A teaser for Savage X Fenty Show Vol. 3 was released on August 26, 2021, and it premiered on Prime Video on September 24, 2021.  A teaser for Savage X Fenty Show Vol. 4 was released on October 14, 2022, the trailer was released on November 3, 2022, and it premiered on Prime Video on November 9, 2022.

Summary

Accolades

References

External links 

Rihanna
Amazon Prime Video original programming
Music television specials
2019 television specials
2020 television specials
2010s American television specials
2020s American television specials
Annual events in the United States
Fashion events in the United States
Primetime Emmy Award-winning television series